Calophyllum pisiferum is a species of flowering plant in the Calophyllaceae family. It is found in Cambodia, Indonesia, Malaysia, Myanmar, Thailand, and Vietnam.

References

Flora of Indomalesia
Least concern plants
pisiferum
Taxonomy articles created by Polbot